Dhanau is a Tehsil and block of Barmer district in Rajasthan, northern India.

References

Villages in Barmer district